Uranophora quadristrigata is a moth in the subfamily Arctiinae. It was described by George Hampson in 1898. It is found on Saint Lucia and Dominica in the West Indies.

References

Moths described in 1898
Euchromiina